Watercolor Postcards is a 2012 American drama film directed by Rajeev Dassani and starring Laura Bell Bundy, Conrad Goode, Bailee Madison, John C. McGinley, Jonathan Banks, and Claudia Christian. It was written by Conrad Goode.

Plot summary
In Bent Arrow, West Texas everything seems to have moved on. Left behind are a precocious 10-year-old named Cotton and Butch, a gentle soul whose life has taken him on a path of heartache from the rough world of pro football, through heart wrenching loss to a roadside stand where he paints Watercolor Postcards. Butch starts to believe he can find happiness again when a relationship blossoms between Cotton's long-lost sister, Sunny, who returns home, disillusioned, after the loss of their mother, and ends up facing her tortured past.

Cast
Laura Bell Bundy as Sunny
Conrad Goode as Butch
Bailee Madison as Cotton
Jonathan Banks as Ledball
John C. McGinley as Merlin
Claudia Christian as Cheryl
Joan Van Ark as Momma
Chad Faust as Tommy
Kaitlin Riley as Becky Mae
Ned Bellamy as Cricket
Haley Strode as Tammy
Rhett Giles as Jackson
Steve Eastin as Morgan
Mary-Pat Green as Tilda
Paul Sanchez as Sheriff Perez
Christian Ijin Link as Car Salesman / Doctor
Elizabeth Baldwin as Nurse
Art Bonilla as Preacher
Wendy Schenker as Rescue Worker
Jessica Starr Folger as Rescue Worker
Jason Michael Lease as Dealership Patron
Joe Ford as E.R Doctor

References

External links

 Official Website
 
 
 Trailer at Vimeo

2012 drama films
American drama films
Films scored by Jeff Russo
2010s English-language films
2010s American films